Constance of Portugal (pt: Constança; 3 January 1290 – Sahagún, 18 November 1313), was Queen of Castile by her marriage to Ferdinand IV.

She was the eldest child and only daughter of King Denis of Portugal and his wife Elizabeth of Aragon, later Saint.

Life

Queen consort of Castile and Leon (1302-1312)

The treaty signed between King Sancho IV of Castile and Denis of Portugal in September 1291, established the betrothal between the eldest son and heir of Sancho IV, Ferdinand (aged 5), with the daughter of the Portuguese King, Constance (aged 20 months).

Finished with the Valladolid Courts of 1295, María de Molina, Dowager Queen and Regent of the Kingdom of Castile, in the name of her son Ferdinand IV and Henry of Castile the Senator, co-regent of the Kingdom, had a meeting with King Denis of Portugal in Ciudad Rodrigo, where the Queen-Regent surrounded several strongholds in order to end the hostilities between both Kingdoms; in addition, the betrothal between Ferdinand IV and Constance was confirmed, and also the future marriage between Ferdinand IV's sister Beatrice with Constance's brother and heir of the Portuguese throne, Afonso was arranged. Later, in the Treaty of Alcañices (1297), the betrothal between Constance and Ferdinand IV was again ratified.

On 23 January 1302 at Valladolid, Constance finally married King Ferdinand IV of Castile. Four years later (1307), shortly after the birth of their first-born child, a daughter called Eleanor (future Queen consort of Aragon), the Castilian King, who was besieging the city of Tordehumos which housed the rebellious magnate Juan Núñez II de Lara, chief of the House of Lara, sent his wife and newborn daughter to solicited a loan from her father, King Denis. During the Valladolid Courts of 1307, where Constance didn't participate, Ferdinand IV tried to end the abuses of the nobility, corrected the administration of justice and softened the tax pressure over the Castilians. The next year (1308), the Queen gave birth to a second daughter, named Constance after her, who died in 1310, aged 2 and was buried in the disappeared convent of Santo Domingo el Real.

In April 1311, while in Palencia, Ferdinand IV became gravely ill and was transported to Valladolid, despite the protests of Constance, who wished his transport to Carrión de los Condes, with the purpose to control him with the help of her ally, Juan Núñez II de Lara. During the King's illness, disputes erupted between Juan Núñez II de Lara, Ferdinand IV's brothers and Juan Manuel, Prince of Villena. While the King was in Toro, the Queen gave birth in Salamanca on 13 August 1311 a son, the future Alfonso XI of Castile. The newborn heir to the Castilian throne was baptized in the Old Cathedral of Salamanca, and, against the King's wishes (who wanted to trust his son to his mother María de Molina), the will of Constance prevailed, who (with the support of Juan Núñez II de Lara and Lope Díaz de Haro) wanted to give the custody of the prince to Peter, Lord of Cameros and brother of Ferdinand IV.

In the autumn of 1311, surged a conspiracy of who wanted to depose Ferdinand IV and place the Lord of Cameros in the throne. The conspiracy included John of Castile, Lord of Valencia de Campos, Juan Núñez II de Lara and Lope Díaz de Haro; however, the project failed because of the staunch refusal of the Dowager Queen María de Molina.

In the Valladolid Courts of 1312, the last of the reign of Ferdinand IV, where reunited funds for the keeping of the army who would fight in the next campaign against the Kingdom of Granada, was reorganized the administration of justice, the territorial and local administration, showing with this the King his wishes of a deep reform in all the ambits of administration, at the time that wanted to reinforce the Crown's authority in detriment of the nobility. The Courts approved the concession of five services and one forera coin, destined to the payment of the King's vassals, with the exception of Juan Núñez II de Lara, who became in the vassal of King Denis of Portugal.

On 7 September 1312 at the city of Jaén, Ferdinand IV died aged 26. Because of the high temperature during the month of his death, Peter, Lord of Cameros and brother of the late King and the now Dowager-Queen Constance decided that his remains would be buried in the Mosque–Cathedral of Córdoba. The Crónica de Alfonso XI confirmed the high temperature as the cause that motivated the burial of Ferdinand IV in Córdoba.

The funeral cortege who accompanied the remains of Ferdinand IV to the city of Córdoba was presided by Constance. The body of the King was deposited in the Major Chapel of the Cathedral by disposition of his wife, and was also decided that six chaplains could pray every night before the tombstone during the month of September in the anniversary of his death, in perpetuity.

Minority of King Alfonso XI of Castile (1312-1313)

When John of Castile, Lord of Valencia de Campos and Juan Núñez II de Lara had knowledge of the death of King Ferdinand IV, they asked Queen María de Molina (who was in Valladolid) to take the regency on behalf of her one-year-old grandson Alfonso XI, in order to avoid that Peter, Lord of Cameros take it. However, the Queen refused to take the regency and she asked that both talk of it with her son Peter.

Juan Núñez II de Lara then tried to kidnap the infant King, who was in the city of Ávila. However, the local authorities stopped him on orders from María de Molina. Shortly after Peter, Lord of Cameros  arrived at Ávila and they refused his entrance to the city. In the meanwhile, John, Lord of Valencia de Campos and Juan Núñez II de Lara, who are in Burgos, called the ricoshombres and others main authorities of the kingdom to be reunited in Sahagún, at the time that Peter, Lord of Cameros obtained the consent of María de Molina to be the guardian of his nephew Alfonso XI during his minority. When John, Lord of Valencia de Campos (who was at Sahagún with the authorities of the kingdom) knew about the closeness of Peter, Lord of Cameros, he ofended him in front of various witnesses, causing that the Lord of Cameros marched against them. The Lord of Valencia de Campos and his collaborators send them to Philip of Castile, Lord of Cabrera and Ribera, brother of Peter, to talk to him; however, the Lord of Cameros reprimanded his brother to be at the side of the Lord of Valencia de Campos. The Lord of Cabrera and Ribera presented to his mother María de Molina the propositions of the Lord of Valencia de Campos, which consisted of a triumvirate between María de Molina and the Lords of Cameros and Valencia de Campos. The Queen agreed with this idea.

The Palencia Courts of 1313

Pedro, Lord of Cameros went to the Cortes of Palencia of 1313 accompanied by an army of 12,000 men, after having recruited in Asturias and Cantabria, and had gone to the Cortes without desire for a fight, but ready for one if the other side wished it. On the side of the Lord of Cameros militated his uncle Alfonso Téllez de Molina (brother of María de Molina), his son Tello Alfonso de Meneses, Rodrigo Álvarez de Asturias and Fernán Ruiz de Saldaña, among others ricoshombres. The main supporters of the Lord of Valencia de Campos was Philip, Lord of Cabrera and Ribera, Fernando de la Cerda and Juan Núñez II de Lara.

Once assembled the attendees in the city of Palencia, it was agreed that each of the two sides kept only 1,300 men in the vicinity of the city, although the agreement was broken by the Lord of Valencia de Campos, who kept next to him 4,000 men, who caused that the Lord of Cameros kept 5,000 of his men at his side. During the Cortes, the Dowager Queen Constance stopped to give her support to the Lord of Cameros and began to support the Lord of Valencia de Campos, proceeding Juan Manuel, Prince of Villena (grandson of Ferdinand III of Castile) in the same way. Fearing that disputes arise, at the initiative of Queen María de Molina, the Lords of Cameros and Valencia de Campos and his companions left the city and stayed in the villages, Peter staying in Amusco, John in Becerril de Campos, Queen Constance in Grijota, and María de Molina in Monzón de Campos. At the same time, the prelates and procurators supporters of the Lord of Cameros and María de Molina agreed to meet in the church of San Francisco at Palencia, of the Order of the Franciscans, while the supporters of the Lord of Valencia de Campos reunited in the convent of San Pablo of Palencia, of the Order of the Dominicans, linked to the House of Lara. Despite the wishes of Peter and his mother, the supporters of the Lord of Valencia de Campos didn't agree to any compromise and appointed him guardian of the King, while the other side appointed guardians the Lord of Cameros and Queen María de Molina.

The double Cortes of Palencia of 1313 gave origin to two different orders: one of them granted by the Infante Juan, as tutor of Alfonso XI, to the councils of Castile, León, Extremadura, Galicia and Asturias —territories in which they predominated their own supporters—; and the other promulgated by Queen María de Molina and her son, the Infante Pedro, as joint tutors of Alfonso XI, and was delivered at the request of the councils of Castilla, Leon, Toledo, Extremadura, Galicia, Asturias and Andalusia. In both charters of the Cortes are noted the presence of the clergy, the nobility and the notorious men of the towns, and it was deduced from them that the Infante Juan had a certain advantage in the number and quality of his allies, as well as the Infante Peter and Queen María de Molina in prelates, masters of the Military Orders and representatives of the councils. The charter given by Queen María de Molina carries the seals of Alfonso XI and those of both tutors, and the one given by Infante Juan only his own seal; this could conclude that the Royal Chancellery was in the hands of the firsts. Finished the Cortes, each of the two sides began to use the royal seal to issue orders and privileges.

Finished the Cortes of Palencia of 1313, Alfonso of Valencia and his father John of Castile "el de Tarifa" occupied the city of León, while the Infante Peter seized of the city of Palencia, directing itself later to Ávila with his mother, where Alfonso XI was. In the meanwhile both sides tried to reach a definitive agreement on who should be the guardian of the infant King, intervening in the negotiations the Masters of the Orders of Santiago and Calatrava, as well as Don Juan Manuel, supporter of John of Castile. The Infante Peter departed for Granada to help Nasr, Sultan of Granada, against whom the son of arráez of Málaga had revolted. However, at the end of 1313 the Infante Peter was aware of the defeat of the Granadian sultan and, during his return to Castile, besieged for three days and took the castle of Rute, located in Córdoba. At the end of 1313, the Infante John summoned the procurators of the Kingdom in Sahagún.

Death and burial

On 18 November 1313, one day after she had dictated her testament, in which she appointed executors to her parents, the Kings of Portugal, Queen Constance of Portugal died in Sahagún at the age of 23, which caused that Infante Juan and his partisans decided to agree with Queen María de Molina, offering her to be the guardian of the King in the territories in which they had declared tutors to her and to her son the Infante Peter, while the Infante John of Castile "el de Tarifa" would act as guardian of the King in the territories that supported him, accepting Queen María de Molina the proposal.

After her death, the remains of Queen Constance were buried in the Royal Monastery of San Benito in Sahagún, where King Alfonso VI of León and Castile and several of his wives had been buried. The remains deposited in a sepulcher, which was placed on the cruiser of the monastery church, next to the graves containing the mortal remains of the wives of Alfonso VI. Her grave had to be destroyed either during the fire that the monastery suffered in 1810, during the Napoleonic invasion of the War of Spanish Independence or during the exclaustration and confiscation of the Royal Monastery  of San Benito, carried out in 1835.

Although the remains of King Alfonso VI and those of his wives are currently deposited in two tombs in the Monastery of the Benedictine Mothers of Sahagún, the remains of Queen Constance of Portugal have disappeared. In the church of San Juan de Sahagún is conserved a tombstone of modern marble, carved in the 19th century, and placed in the rung that leads to the high altar of the church, next to a similar gravestone in which reference is made to the Infante Sancho Alfónsez, only son of King Alfonso VI, in which the following epitaph was sculpted:

The epitaph, roughly translated says: "Here lies Queen Constance, wife of King Ferdinand IV. She died on 23 November 1313". The tombstone was carved after the Spanish War of Independence, when, after the destruction caused in the monastery by the looting carried out by the French troops, and by the fire of 1810, was proceeded to rebuild the Benedictine monastery. However, due to the confiscation of 1835, the works were paralyzed. The purpose of the tombstone, which measures 1.39 meters long by 0.46 meters wide, was to mark the place occupied by the tomb in which the remains of Queen Constance, who had disappeared, had been resting in the Royal Monastery of San Benito. Nevertheless, the tombstone was later placed in the church of San Juan of Sahagún.

Ancestry

Notes

References

Bibliography
 
 
 
 
 
 
 
 
 
 
 
 
 

|-

|-

1290 births
1313 deaths
Portuguese infantas
House of Burgundy-Portugal
Castilian queen consorts
Leonese queen consorts
Galician queens consort
13th-century Portuguese people
14th-century Portuguese people
13th-century Portuguese women
14th-century Portuguese women
14th-century Castilians
14th-century Spanish women
Daughters of kings
Queen mothers
Portuguese people of Italian descent